Dar Deh (also known as Darreh Deh and Zar Deh) is a village in Poshtkuh Rural District, in the Central District of Firuzkuh County, Tehran Province, Iran. At the 2006 census, its population was 411, in 112 families.

References 

Populated places in Firuzkuh County